Feyzi Mengüç (1894 in İstanbul – 23 June 1966) was the 9th Chief of the General Staff of Turkey.

Career
He graduated from the military academy and served as combat engineer officer during World War I.

Mengüç left his position in Ottoman Army and joined the war effort for the independence of Turkey on 31 July 1921.

After graduating from the Army War College in 1925, he served in various commands till 1939.

In 1939, Brigadier General, Major-General in 1941, Lieutenant General in 1947 and was promoted to the rank of General in 1953. While in this rank he was appointed as the head of the Military Supreme Court.

He served as acting Chief of General Staff between 11 October 1957 and 22 August May 1958.

He retired from his duties on 15 December 1959.

References

1894 births
1966 deaths
Ottoman military personnel of World War I
Turkish military personnel of the Turkish War of Independence